William Rush Merriam (July 26, 1849February 18, 1931) was an American politician and banker. A Republican, he served as the eighth Governor of Minnesota from 1889 to 1893.

Life and career
Merriam was born in Wadham's Mills, New York, the son of Mahala Kimpton (Delano) and Minnesota House Speaker John L. Merriam. He served in the Minnesota House of Representatives in 1883 and 1887 and was the Speaker of the House in 1887. He served as the 11th Governor of Minnesota from January 9, 1889 to January 4, 1893. He was a Republican.

By 1888 a split in the state Republican Party was reflected in an unorthodox selection of a gubernatorial candidate. Instead of supporting the reform-minded incumbent, Andrew Ryan McGill, a majority of party stalwarts rallied behind William Merriam, an ambitious St. Paul banker and speaker of the Minnesota House of Representatives.

Merriam's re-election campaign two years later was affected by another, more widespread phenomenon, the Farmers' Alliance. This third party of disaffected Republicans and Democrats was dedicated to promoting the commercial and social interests of agrarian America. Merriam defeated the Alliance candidate in 1890, but the upstart party significantly eroded his plurality.

As governor, Merriam was a thrifty executive who was more interested in limiting spending than in legislative reform. The most notable legacy of his administration was the adoption of the Australian ballot, which allowed citizens to vote in comparative privacy. In his private life, the sociable Merriam was keen on sports, owned horses, and was said to possess "good nature, gracious manners, and an attractive personality."

Merriam's final accomplishment was appropriate for a banker and businessman who could work well with both people and numbers. He was director of the twelfth national census and later persuaded Congress to establish a permanent Census Bureau, where he served as its first director. Merriam never returned to Minnesota, but retired instead to Florida, where he died in Port Sewall at age 81.

Remains
His three-quarter portrait by the Swiss born American artist Adolfo Müller-Ury (1862–1947) was painted in 1892. This and a portrait of his wife were exhibited in St. Paul in that year. A small, bust-length portrait, is now in the collection of the Newport Preservation Society, Rhode Island; it was formerly in the collections of Jessica Dragonette and the University of Wyoming. Müller-Ury is also known to have painted a portrait of their son Amherst Merriam as a baby.

Merriam is buried at Rock Creek Cemetery in Washington, DC.

References

External links
Biographical information and his  gubernatorial records are available for research use at the Minnesota Historical Society.
Minnesota Legislators Past and Present

  	

1849 births
1931 deaths
Republican Party governors of Minnesota
Speakers of the Minnesota House of Representatives
Republican Party members of the Minnesota House of Representatives
American Episcopalians
United States Census Bureau people
Theodore Roosevelt administration personnel